SAC Borhan bin Daud was a former Malaysian police officer.

Early life
Borhan was born on 5 September 1958 in Alor Gajah, Malacca.

Police career
Borhan joined the police force on 25 May 1980 as Probationary Inspector and underwent basic police training at the Police Training Center on Gurney Road, Kuala Lumpur. After completing training, he was assigned to the Special Branch, Bukit Aman.

While working at the Bukit Aman Special Branch, he held the rank of Chief Inspector and led a special operation called "Operation Kelisa" in the Mentakab area, Pahang on 10 May 1986 to detect and cripple the movement of communist terrorists. In this operation, Borhan and his team raided a house used as a meeting place for communist terrorists. As a result of the raid, four communist terrorists were killed and various types of firearms including ammunition and grenades were seized 

On 12 March 1988, Borhan was once again responsible for leading a secret operation of the Bukit Aman Special Branch called "Operation Tanglung". He once again highlighted the wisdom of leading through careful planning that led to the successful arrest of 86 communist terrorists from the 6th Combat Unit led by Chong Chor. Following that, the police have managed to seize a large number of firearms, ammunition, and explosives including important documents of high intelligence value.

Borhan's last position in the police force was Head of the Malacca Special Branch with the rank of Senior Assistant Commissioner (SAC).

Honours
 :
 Recipient of the Star of the Commander of Valour (P.G.B.) (1989)
 Officer of the Order of the Defender of the Realm (K.M.N.) (2017)
 :
 Member of the Order of the Crown of Pahang (AMP) (2007)
 :
 Companion Class II of the Exalted Order of Malacca (D.P.S.M.) - Datuk (2018)

References

1958 births
Living people
Malaysian police officers
Recipients of the Star of the Commander of Valour
Officers of the Order of the Defender of the Realm